Events from the year 1761 in Scotland.

Incumbents

Law officers 
 Lord Advocate – Thomas Miller of Glenlee
 Solicitor General for Scotland – James Montgomery jointly with Francis Garden

Judiciary 
 Lord President of the Court of Session – Lord Arniston, the younger
 Lord Justice General – Lord Ilay to 15 April; then from 27 June Marquess of Tweeddale
 Lord Justice Clerk – Lord Tinwald

Events 
 22 October – Relief Church founded as a liberal Presbyterian denomination at Colinsburgh by Thomas Gillespie, Thomas Boston and Thomas Colier.
 Fenwick Weavers' Society formed at Fenwick, East Ayrshire.
 Penicuik House in Midlothian built in Palladian style on the site of an earlier house by Sir James Clerk, 3rd Baronet, for himself.
 Dunmore Pineapple built.

Births 
 17 January – James Hall, geologist (died 1832)
 7 June – John Rennie the Elder, civil engineer (died 1821 in London)
 27 August – William Young, Royal Navy officer (died 1847 in Surrey)
 30 August (bapt.) – Archibald Elliot, architect (died 1823)
 October – Thomas Christie, radical political writer (died 1796 in Suriname)
 8 October – Andrew Snape Douglas, Royal Navy captain (died 1797)
 27 October – Matthew Baillie, physician and pathologist (died 1823 in Gloucestershire)
 13 November – John Moore, British Army general (killed 1809 at Battle of Corunna)

Deaths 
 15 April – Archibald Campbell, 3rd Duke of Argyll, politician, lawyer, businessman and soldier (born 1682 in England; died in London)
 22 October – Patrick Heron, politician (born c. 1672)
 23 December – Alastair Ruadh MacDonnell, Jacobite (born c. 1725)

The arts
 Robert Adam and Sir William Chambers are jointly appointed Architect of the King's Works to King George III of Great Britain.
 After March – Allan Ramsay appointed to succeed John Shackelton as Principal Painter in Ordinary to King George III.
 December – James Macpherson, supposedly translating "Ossian", publishes Fingal, an Ancient Epic Poem in Six Books, together with Several Other Poems composed by Ossian, the Son of Fingal, translated from the Gaelic Language.

Sport 
 Bruntsfield Links Golfing Society formed on the outskirts of Edinburgh.

See also 

 Timeline of Scottish history

References 

 
Years of the 18th century in Scotland
Scotland
1760s in Scotland